Timothy Sykes is a penny stock trader who earned $1.65 million from a $12,415 Bar mitzvah gift through day trading while in college.

Career
Sykes graduated from Tulane University in 2003 with a bachelor's degree in philosophy and a minor in business. While at Tulane, Sykes routinely cut class to day trade. In 2003 he founded Cilantro Fund Management, a small short bias hedge fund, using $1 million mostly from his friends and family. After initially seeing profits the fund shut down 3 years later after heavy losses.

In 2006, Sykes was included on Trader Monthly'''s "30 Under 30" list of up-and-coming traders in the market, a selection which editor Randall Lane later called "our worst pick" among the chosen honorees. Sykes claimed that the Cilantro Fund was "the number one long-short microstock hedge fund in the country, according to Barclays"; Lane later discovered that the rating came from "the Barclay Group," a small research company based in Fairfield, Iowa, and not the well-known Barclays British bank.

In 2008 Sykes attempted to recreate his initial investing success by again starting with $12,415.

Sykes self-published An American Hedge Fund: How I Made $2 Million as a Stock Operator & Created a Hedge Fund'' in 2007. The book documented Sykes' experiences as a day-trader and the difficulties he encountered in attempting to start a hedge fund.

In 2012, Sykes created "Miss Penny Stock," a financial beauty pageant among the female representatives for his brand and company.

Appeared on Below Deck season 2 episode 10. And season 5 episode 13. On Bravo network

Teaching and other projects
After the shut down of Cilantro Fund Partners in 2007, Sykes wrote the book "An American Hedge Fund" and launched TimothySykes.com.

In 2009, Sykes launched Investimonials.com, a website devoted to collecting user reviews of financial services, videos, and books, as well as financial brokers.

Sykes co-founded Profit.ly in 2011, a social service with about 20,000 users that provides stock trade information online. Sykes said the service serves two purposes: "creating public track records for gurus, newsletter writers and students everyone to learn from both the wins and losses of other traders to benefit the entire industry." One of Sykes’ students, Tim Grittani, was able to turn $1,500 into $1 million in three years by trading stocks. Another student, Jack Kellogg, made more than $10 million by stock trading under Sykes’ tutelage.

Sykes founded the Timothy Sykes Foundation, which has raised $600,000 and has partnered with Make-a-Wish Foundation and the Boys and Girls Club. 

In February 2017, Sykes donated $1 million to Pencils of Promise to help build 20 new primary schools across Ghana, Guatemala and Laos, to be completed between 2017 and 2018.

The Timothy Sykes Foundation was eventually renamed the Karmagawa Foundation and by 2019, Karmagawa had built 57 schools and donated more than $4 million to 45 charities for environmental causes.

In 2020, Sykes and Karmagawa made a joint pledge to donate $1 million for relief efforts in Yemen during the Yemeni civil war and the cholera and COVID-19 epidemics.  Karmagawa built its 100th school in Myanmar in 2022.

Controversy

Sykes has publicly criticized various businesses and celebrities, including Shaquille O'Neal and Justin Bieber, for promoting "pump and dump" schemes, in which an investor purchases stock, hypes others into buying that stock to inflate its price, then sells the shares at a higher price and subsequently shorts the stock to profit from the resulting decline.

In May 2017, Sykes and Bow Wow had an Instagram feud in which at least one user accused Sykes of using "coded racist language".

References

External links

Living people
American finance and investment writers
American investors
20th-century American Jews
American hedge fund managers
American stock traders
Stock and commodity market managers
Tulane University alumni
1981 births
21st-century American Jews